Layo is a village and the capital of the Layo District, Canas Province, Cusco Region, Peru.

It is located in the southern highlands of Peru.

References

Populated places in the Cusco Region